is a comedian, actor, sculptor, and potter from Saitama Prefecture, Japan. He graduated from Kasukabe High School and Tama Art University. Outside Japan, he is most well known for playing the PC (opposite Kentarō Kobayashi who plays the Mac) in the "Get A Mac" advertising campaign in Japan. He is a member of the Rahmens owarai comedy duo.

Filmography

Film
I Am a Hero (2016) – Korori Nakata
Rin (2018)
Lost in Ramen (2018)
Aircraft Carrier Ibuki (2019) – Kazuma Tōdō
I Was a Secret Bitch (2020) – Nagata
Your Turn to Kill: The Movie (2021)
99.9 Criminal Lawyer: The Movie (2021) – Tatsuya Akashi

Television
Kamen Rider Double (2009) – Ikari (ep. 7 - 8)/Cockroach Dopant (ep. 7 - 8)
All Esper Dayo! SP (2015) – Teacher Yukio Kajimoto
99.9 (2016) – Tatsuya Akashi
Gu.ra.me! (2016) – Kanda
Your Turn to Kill (2019)
Yell (2020) – Kenzō Ōkura

Anime
Green vs. Red (2008) – Yasuo
Bessatsu Olympia Kyklos (2020) – Head of the Village

References

See also
Apple Inc. advertising
List of Japanese comedians
Owarai

1973 births
Japanese male actors
Japanese comedians
Japanese potters
Japanese sculptors
Actors from Saitama Prefecture
Living people
Apple Inc. advertising
Artists from Saitama Prefecture